Sir Sydney Harold Gillett, 1st Baronet, MC, FCA (27 November 1890 – 21 September 1976) was Lord Mayor of London.

He was a chartered accountant. He was elected Sheriff of the City of London for 1952 and Lord Mayor of London in 1958.

Awarded the Military Cross on 14 January 1916, Gillett was knighted on 12 June 1953.

He was president of the Baden-Powell House building committee of The Scout Association from 1953 until the building was finished in 1961. As a tribute to his contributions, the Scout Association has created a Sir Harold Gillett Memorial Fund to help pay the expenses of special needs Scouts and members in need to visit London and stay at the Baden-Powell House hostel. He was a member of the Council of the Corporation of Foreign Bondholders, from 1965 until his death in 1976

Gillett was created a baronet, of Bassishaw Ward in the City of London, on 4 December 1959. He died in September 1976, aged 85, and was succeeded in the baronetcy by his son Robin.

References

Kidd, Charles, Williamson, David (editors). Debrett's Peerage and Baronetage (1990 edition). New York: St Martin's Press, 1990.

1890 births
1976 deaths
Gillett, Sir Harold, 1st Baronet
The Scout Association
People associated with Scouting
Sheriffs of the City of London
20th-century lord mayors of London
20th-century English politicians
Recipients of the Military Cross
Middlesex Regiment officers
British Army personnel of World War I